Mohamed Choua (born 25 December 1992) is a Moroccan professional basketball player. He currently plays for the ASS Sale club of the FIBA Africa Club Champions Cup and the Nationale 1, Morocco’s first division.

He represented Morocco's national basketball team at the 2017 AfroBasket in Tunisia and Senegal. There, he recorded most minutes, rebounds, steals and blocks for Morocco.

References

External links
 FIBA profile
 Real GM profile
 Afrobasket.com profile

1992 births
Living people
Power forwards (basketball)
Centers (basketball)
Moroccan men's basketball players
People from Agadir
AS Salé (basketball) players